Milan Bizovičar (13 January 1927 – 2006) was a Slovene painter and illustrator.

Bizovičar was born in Ljubljana in 1927. He studied at the Academy of Fine Arts in Ljubljana from where he graduated in 1949. He also illustrated numerous children's books and won the Levstik Award for his illustrations five times, in 1958, 1962, 1967, 1974 and 1975.

Selected Illustrated Works

 Televizijski otroci (Television Children), written by Neža Maurer, 1986
 Ko smo se ženili (When We Were Getting Married), written by Ivan Potrč, 1983
 Bobri (Beavers), written by Janez Jalen, 1982
 Luka (Luka), written by Beno Zupančič, 1981
 Abadon, written by Janez Mencinger, 1980
 Žrebiček brez potnega lista (The Foal Without A Passport), written by Branka Jurca, 1980
 Prgišče zvezd (A Fistful of Stars), written by Branka Jurca, 1980
 Najdihojca (Najdihojca), written by Fran Levstik, 1979
 Najmočnejši fantek na svetu (The Strongest Boy in the World), written by Lojze Kovačič, 1977
 Stolp iz voščilnic (The Greeting Card Tower), written by Ela Peroci, 1977
 Majhne besede, velike reči (Small Words, Large Things), written by Smiljan Rozman, 1976
 Dobri sovražnikov pes (The Good Enemy Dog), written by Kristina Brenk, 1975
 Abecedarija (Alphabetary), written by Dane Zajc, 1975
 Miška spi (The Little Mouse Sleeps), written by Svetlana Makarovič, 1975
 Ježek se ženi (The Hedgehog's Wedding), written by Jože Šmit, 1974 
 Možiček med dimniki (A Man Amidst the Chimneys), written by Lojze Kovačič, 1974
 Zgodbe iz mesta Rič-Rač (Tales from Rič-Rač Town), written by Lojze Kovačič, 1969
 Prvi maj (First of May), written by Prežihov Voranc, 1961

References

Slovenian male painters
Slovenian illustrators
1927 births
2006 deaths
Artists from Ljubljana
Levstik Award laureates
University of Ljubljana alumni
20th-century Slovenian painters
20th-century Slovenian male artists